The 1906–07 Welsh Amateur Cup was the seventeenth season of the Welsh Amateur Cup. The cup was won by Buckley Engineers who defeated Aberystwyth 2-1 in a replayed final at Newtown.

First round

Second round

Third round

Fourth round

Semi-final

Final

References

1905-06
Welsh Cup